Puncak Kasih (English: "Love's Summit") is the fourth studio album from Malaysian pop singer Ziana Zain, released on 28 May 1997 by BMG Music. The album incorporates elements of pop, ballad and traditional music.

Puncak Kasih has been certified 3× platinum for selling more than 150,000 copies and it consequently became Ziana's third consecutive platinum album in Malaysia. The album also won the award Best Pop Album in 1998's Anugerah Industri Muzik. This album also had overwhelming receptions in neighboring countries such as Indonesia, Brunei and Singapore.

The album spawned five singles, "Puncak Kasih", "Kalau Mencari Teman","Berpisah Jua","Ada Cinta" and "Terlerai Kasih" that attained chart success. Another track, "Satu Detik" was later released as promotional single for her nationwide concert tour in 1998. The lead single, "Puncak Kasih", set a record for topping Carta Muzik Muzik at number 1 for fifteen consecutive weeks. In Indonesia, Puncak Kasih became one of the most popular Malaysian song in 1997.

Track listing
 "Puncak Kasih" (Adnan Abu Hassan, Maya Sari) — 5:32
 "Sepi Tanpa Rela" (Johari Teh) — 4:19
 "Berpisah Jua"  (Asmin Mudin) — 5:10
 "Satu Detik" (Azlan Abu Hassan, Maya Sari) — 3:38
 "Cinta Di Menara Rindu" (Idzahar, Azam Dungun) — 5:17
 "Dugaan Buatmu" (Adnan Abu Hassan, Amran Omar) — 5:17
 "Kalau Mencari Teman" (Razman, Habsah Hassan) — 4:22
 "Tika Naik Tika Jatuh" (Iraas Irma, Fitri Amri) — 5:57
 "Ada Cinta" (Azlan Abu Hassan, Ning Baizura) — 4:15
 "Terlerai Kasih" (Johari Teh) — 4:13
 "Sangkar Cinta (Remix)" - CD Only (Idzahar, Azam Dungun) — 5:09

Commercial performance
Puncak Kasih debuted at number 4 on the week ending June 10, 1997. The following week, it jumped to number two. On its third week, the album finally topped the Malaysian Album Chart, dethroning 911's The Journey on the week ending June 24, 1997.

Awards

Anugerah Juara Lagu
Three singles from the album were shortlisted in the semi-final of 1998's Anugerah Juara Lagu, namely "Puncak Kasih", "Kalau Mencari Teman" and "Berpisah Jua". Nevertheless, the latter failed to advance into the final. Additionally, the song "Puncak Kasih" won the category Best Ballad Song in the ceremony.

|-
|  rowspan=6|1998 || rowspan=2|"Puncak Kasih" ||  Best Ballad Song || 
|-
| Best Song || 
|-
|  rowspan=2| "Berpisah Jua" || Best Ballad Song|| 
|-
| Best Song || 
|-
| rowspan=2| "Kalau Mencari Teman" || Best Traditional Song || 
|-
| Best Song ||

Anugerah Industri Muzik
In 1998, the album Puncak Kasih received two nominations in Anugerah Industri Muzik which were Best Pop Album as well as Best Female Vocalist in an Album where it won Best Pop Album. Additionally, the song Puncak Kasih was nominated for Best Song award but it lost to Innuendo's "Selamanya".

|-
|  rowspan=3|1998 || rowspan=2|Puncak Kasih ||  Best Pop Album || 
|-
| Best Female Vocalist in an Album ||  
|-
| "Puncak Kasih" || Best Song ||

Anugerah Video Muzik

|-
|  1998 || "Puncak Kasih" ||  Most Popular Video Clip || 
|-

Personnel
 Executive producer - Mohd Firhad
 A & R executive - Asni
 Mastering Engineer - Saari Amri, Johari Teh, Adnan Abu Hassan, Fauzi Marzuki, Raman
 Promotion unit - Samirah Hambali, Asri Ismail, Shila, Man Toba, Rouslan, Rohani, Eddie & Nora
 Photographer - Adam Photo
 Make-up - Kayla Adzman
 Jewelry - Kedai Emas Golden Chance Lot 1.80 Ampang Park Complex
 Cover artwork & photography - Bombay (KC Sdn. Bhd.)
 Graphic design -  Shairul (KC Sdn. Bhd.)

Charts

References

External links
 Fan Site

Ziana Zain albums
1997 albums
Bertelsmann Music Group albums
Malay-language albums